Solidays is a French annual music festival that takes place at the Longchamp Racecourse in Paris at the end of June. Organized by Solidarité sida (a French HIV/AIDS awareness group for youth), the event brings together more than 150 artists and 170 000 festival-goers for three days (Friday, Saturday and Sunday). The proceeds from the festival are donated to organisations fighting against HIV/AIDS, especially for those focusing on the African continent.

The festival has been held since 1999. The performers involved in Solidays accept a reduced fee or appear for free as a sign of their solidarity. The 2013 edition raised over 2 million euros. The festival also features bungee jumping in addition to the music. The 2022 festival happened on June 24-26.

Over the years, many French and foreign artists have appeared at Solidays, including DJ Snake, Bigflo & Oli, Kungs, Mac Miller, Vanessa Paradis, M83, Synapson, Paul Kalkbrenner, Bénabar, Madeon, Shaka Ponk, David Guetta, Kool & the Gang, Stromae, Louis Bertignac, Lily Allen, Louise Attaque, Grand Corps Malade, Earth, Wind & Fire and Diplo.

2020 edition and COVID-19 pandemic 
On 13  April 2020, the festival announced on its website that the 2020 edition of the festival would be cancelled because of the ongoing COVID-19 pandemic. Luc Barruet, the founder of the festival, asked festival goers not to ask for reimbursement because he said that the cancellation was putting the festival in danger.

References

External links

Music festivals in France
Annual events in France